The 2018–19 Biathlon World Cup – Stage 3 was the third event of the season and was held in Nové Město, Czech Republic, from 20–23 December 2018.

Schedule of events 
The events took place at the following times.

Medal winners

Men

Women

References 

2018–19 Biathlon World Cup
2018 in Czech sport
Biathlon World Cup - Stage 3
Biathlon competitions in the Czech Republic